Tom Hooper is a British film and television director.

Tom Hooper may also refer to:

Tom Hooper (ice hockey) (1883–1960), Canadian ice hockey player
Tom Hooper (musician), Canadian songwriter and musician
Tom Hooper (rugby union), Australian rugby union player